Barrambie Station is a pastoral lease that has previously operated as a sheep station but now is a cattle station in Western Australia. 

The  property has a five bedroom homestead and can carry 450 head of cattle and was listed for sale in 2018 for 680,000. It had been very lightly stocked to virtually destocked from about 2004 to 2019 and the range report gives the property a potential carrying capacity of up to 680 cattle. In 2019 it was carrying 60 droughtmaster cattle. It was originally set up as a sheep station.

See also
List of ranches and stations
List of pastoral leases in Western Australia

References

Pastoral leases in Western Australia
Stations (Australian agriculture)
Homesteads in Western Australia
Mid West (Western Australia)